La Clota is a neighborhood in the Horta-Guinardó district of Barcelona, Catalonia (Spain).

Clota, la
Clota, la